Luis Osvaldo Maira Aguirre (born 9 August 1940) is a Chilean politician and lawyer who served as deputy –during the Popular Unity– and as minister of State under Eduardo Frei Ruíz-Tagle's government. Similarly, he served as ambassador in Mexico and Argentina.

References

External links
 Profile at BCN

1940 births
Living people
People from Santiago
Christian Democratic Party (Chile) politicians
Christian Left (Chile) politicians
Broad Party of Socialist Left politicians
Socialist Party of Chile politicians
Deputies of the XLV Legislative Period of the National Congress of Chile
Deputies of the XLVI Legislative Period of the National Congress of Chile
Deputies of the XLVII Legislative Period of the National Congress of Chile
Ambassadors of Chile to Argentina
Ambassadors of Chile to Mexico
20th-century Chilean lawyers
University of Chile alumni